Ralph Edward Stewart (December 10, 1925 – July 30, 2016) was an American football player and coach. He was a star player (center and linebacker) at the University of Missouri, and played at center for the 1940s New York Yankees and Baltimore Colts football teams. After working as a line coach at Drake University, he was named athletic director and head coach of the University of South Dakota football program in 1956. Stewart later returned to the University of Missouri as director of intramural athletics.  He earned three degrees from the University of Missouri (B.S., M.Ed., Ed.D) and served 20 years as chairman of its Physical Education Department before his retirement in 1991. Stewart died on July 30, 2016.

Head coaching record

References

1925 births
2016 deaths
American football centers
Baltimore Colts (1947–1950) players
Basketball coaches from Missouri
Drake Bulldogs football coaches
Iowa Wesleyan Tigers football coaches
Iowa Wesleyan Tigers men's basketball coaches
Missouri Tigers football players
Notre Dame Fighting Irish football players
New York Yankees (AAFC) players
South Dakota Coyotes athletic directors
South Dakota Coyotes football coaches
Players of American football from St. Louis